Mark Madsen (born 23 September 1984) is a Danish professional mixed martial artist and former Greco-Roman wrestler. As a mixed martial artist, he currently competes in the lightweight division of the Ultimate Fighting Championship (UFC).

As a wrestler, Madsen won the 2016 Summer Olympic Games silver medal in the 75 kg class and was a five-time World Championship medalist.

Wrestling career

Madsen, who started wrestling at age of six, made his official debut at the 2008 Summer Olympics in Beijing, where he lost to Russia's Varteres Samurgashev in the first preliminary round of men's Greco-Roman 74 kg, with a technical score of 1–7, and a classification score of 1–3.

At the 2012 Summer Olympics in London, England, Madsen was defeated by another Russian wrestler Roman Vlasov, in the second round of the men's Greco-Roman 74 kg category. Because his opponent advanced further until the final round, Madsen qualified for the repechage bout, where he scored four points and defeated France's Christophe Guénot. In the bronze medal match, Madsen was unable to score enough points in the first two periods, and lost to Lithuania's Aleksandr Kazakevič, finishing only in fifth position.

Few months after the games, Madsen has signed a contract with European MMA, with sights on having his first fight inside the MMA cage by February 2013.

In the 2016 Summer Olympics at Rio, Madsen won silver in men's Greco-Roman 75 kg, losing the final match against Roman Vlasov, who previously beat him in the 2012 Summer Olympics.

Mixed martial arts career

Early career
Madsen competed in two professional bouts in 2013 and 2014 but because he was receiving salary from the Danish Wrestling Federation for his commitment, Madsen was subsequently essentially forbidden to compete in mixed martial arts. Due to his retirement from wrestling, he was allowed to start training and competing in mixed martial arts.

After amassing four straight professional victories in the regional circuit, Madsen signed with Cage Warriors. Madsen made his promotional debut against Alexandre Bordin at Cage Warriors Academy's inaugural event on September 23, 2018. The fight was largely contested on the ground, leading Madsen to a unanimous decision victory by dominant grappling.

After the bout with Bordin, Madsen has been training at Xtreme Couture in Las Vegas. Madsen headlined Cage Warriors Academy Denmark2 against Mathew Bonner on December 15, 2018 and won the bout via unanimous decision.

Madsen made his Cage Warriors debut against Thibaud Larchet at Cage Warriors 103 on March 9, 2019. Madsen won the fight via unanimous decision.

Madsen faced Danish boxer Patrick Nielsen in an MMA bout at Olympian Fight Night1 on June 8, 2019. Madsen won the fight in the first round via rear-naked choke.

Ultimate Fighting Championship
Madsen made his promotional debut against Danillo Belluardo on September 28, 2019 at UFC on ESPN+ 18. He won the fight via TKO in the first round.

After recovering from shoulder injury and staph infection, Madsen returned to face Austin Hubbard on March 7, 2020 at UFC 248. He used his superior wrestling to win the fight by unanimous decision despite suffering a broken jaw during the course of the bout.

Madsen faced Clay Guida on August 21, 2021 in the co-main event in UFC on ESPN: Cannonier vs. Gastelum. He won the fight via split decision.

Madsen was scheduled to face Vinc Pichel on February 12, 2022 at UFC 271.  However, they were pushed back to April 9, 2022 at UFC 273 due to unknown reasons. He won the fight via unanimous decision.

Madsen was scheduled to face Drakkar Klose on October 29, 2022, at UFC Fight Night 213.  However, Klose pulled out in mid-October due to an anterior cruciate ligament injury.  He was replaced by Grant Dawson. In turn, the bout was moved to UFC Fight Night 214 on November 5, 2022. At the weigh-ins, Dawson weighed in at 157.5 pounds, one and a half pounds over the lightweight non-title fight limit. His bout is expected to proceed at catchweight and he will be fined 30% of his individual purse, which will go to Madsen. He lost the fight via a rear-naked choke submission in the third round.

Championships and accomplishments

Mixed martial arts
Nordic MMA Awards - MMAviking.com
2018 Knockout of the Year vs. Dez Parker
2019 Breakthrough Fighter of the Year

Amateur wrestling
Olympic Games
2016 Rio de Janeiro - Greco-Roman, 75 kg 
2012 London - Greco-Roman, 74 kg 5th Place
International Federation of Associated Wrestling Styles
World Wrestling Championships
2005 Budapest - Greco-Roman, 74 kg 
2006 Guangzhou - Greco-Roman, 74 kg 
2007 Baku - Greco-Roman, 74 kg 
2009 Herning - Greco-Roman, 74 kg 
2015 Las Vegas - Greco-Roman, 75kg 
European Wrestling Championships
2004 Murska Sobota - Greco-Roman, Junior level, 74 kg 
2014 Vantaa - Greco-Roman, 75 kg 
Nordic Wrestling Association
2005 Nordic Championships Greco-Roman, 74 kg 
2006 Nordic Championships Greco-Roman, 74 kg 
2008 Nordic Championships Greco-Roman, 74 kg 
2010 Nordic Championships Greco-Roman, 74 kg 
2015 Nordic Championships Greco-Roman, 80 kg 
2016 Nordic Championships Greco-Roman, 75 kg 
2017 Nordic Championships Greco-Roman, 80 kg 
Danish Wrestling Federation
1999 Danish Championships Greco-Roman, 54 kg 
2001 Danish Championships Greco-Roman, 69 kg 
2002 Danish Championships Greco-Roman, 74 kg 
2004 Danish Championships Greco-Roman, 74 kg 
2005 Danish Championships Greco-Roman, 84 kg 
2007 Danish Championships Greco-Roman, 84 kg 
2008 Danish Championships Greco-Roman, 84 kg 
2009 Danish Championships Greco-Roman, 84 kg 
2010 Danish Championships Greco-Roman, 96 kg 
2015 Danish Championships Greco-Roman, 80 kg 
2016 Danish Championships Greco-Roman, 80 kg 
2017 Danish Championships Greco-Roman, 80 kg

Mixed martial arts record

|-
|Loss
|align=center|12–1
|Grant Dawson
|Submission (rear-naked choke)
|UFC Fight Night: Rodriguez vs. Lemos
|
|align=center|3
|align=center|2:04
|Las Vegas, Nevada, United States
|
|-
|Win
|align=center|12–0
|Vinc Pichel
|Decision (unanimous)
|UFC 273
|
|align=center|3
|align=center|5:00
|Jacksonville, Florida, United States
|
|-
|Win
|align=center|11–0
|Clay Guida
|Decision (split)
|UFC on ESPN: Cannonier vs. Gastelum
|
|align=center|3
|align=center|5:00
|Las Vegas, Nevada, United States
|
|-
|Win
|align=center|10–0
|Austin Hubbard
|Decision (unanimous)
|UFC 248
|
|align=center|3
|align=center|5:00
|Las Vegas, Nevada, United States
|
|-
|Win
|align=center|9–0
|Danilo Belluardo
|TKO (punches)
|UFC Fight Night: Hermansson vs. Cannonier
|
|align=center|1
|align=center|1:12
|Copenhagen, Denmark
|
|-
| Win
| align=center| 8–0
| Patrick Nielsen
| Submission (rear-naked choke)
| Olympian Fight Night
| 
| align=center| 1
| align=center| 2:47
| Copenhagen, Denmark
|
|-
| Win
| align=center| 7–0
| Thibaud Larchet
| Decision (unanimous)
| Cage Warriors 103
| 
| align=center| 3
| align=center| 5:00
| Copenhagen, Denmark
|
|-
| Win
| align=center| 6–0
| Matthew Bonner
| Decision (unanimous)
| Cage Warriors Academy Denmark 2
| 
| align=center| 3
| align=center| 5:00
| Frederikshavn, Denmark
|
|-
| Win
| align=center| 5–0
| Alexandre Bordin
| Decision (unanimous)
| Cage Warriors Academy Denmark 1
| 
| align=center| 3
| align=center| 5:00
| Nykøbing Falster, Denmark
|
|-
| Win
| align=center| 4–0
| Dez Parker
| KO (punch)
| Danish MMA Night Vol. 1
| 
| align=center| 1
| align=center| 4:30
| Brøndby, Denmark
| 
|-
| Win
| align=center| 3–0
| Matthias Freyschuss
| Technical Submission (guillotine choke)
| MMA Galla 04
| 
| align=center| 1
| align=center| 0:26
| Nykøbing Falster, Denmark
| 
|-
| Win
| align=center| 2–0
| Chay Ingram
| Submission (guillotine choke)
| European MMA 9: "Mark" Your Time
| 
| align=center| 1
| align=center| 2:27
| Copenhagen, Denmark
| 
|-
| Win
| align=center| 1–0
| Philipp Henze
| TKO (punches)
| European MMA 6
| 
| align=center| 1
| align=center| 0:44
| Copenhagen, Denmark
|
|-

See also
 List of current UFC fighters
 List of male mixed martial artists

References

External links
 
 NBC 2008 Olympics Profile

1984 births
Living people
Danish male mixed martial artists
Mixed martial artists utilizing Greco-Roman wrestling
Danish male sport wrestlers
Welterweight mixed martial artists
Lightweight mixed martial artists
Olympic wrestlers of Denmark
Wrestlers at the 2008 Summer Olympics
Wrestlers at the 2012 Summer Olympics
Wrestlers at the 2016 Summer Olympics
Wrestlers at the 2015 European Games
Olympic silver medalists for Denmark
Olympic medalists in wrestling
Medalists at the 2016 Summer Olympics
World Wrestling Championships medalists
European Games competitors for Denmark
European Wrestling Championships medalists
Ultimate Fighting Championship male fighters
People from Guldborgsund Municipality
Sportspeople from Region Zealand